Decibelle (formerly Estrojam) is a 501c3 NFP music and culture festival that promotes equality and was established in 2003.  Past headliners have included, Wanda Jackson (First Lady of Rock who toured with Elvis in the 1950s and 1960s), Nina Hagen, Concrete Blonde, Cat Power, The Gossip, Peaches, Amy Ray of the Indigo Girls and Margaret Cho. The hip hop, post punk, disco, and dance-punk band ESG played their final show on Friday, September 21, 2007, at Chicago's Abbey Pub, during the Decibelle festival.

In 2006, Decibelle was featured in the Chicago Historical Society's "History of Women's Music" event. In 2008, Decibelle founder T. Khyentse James was awarded the "Outstanding Community Leader" Award from the National Organization for Women (Chicago) for Decibelle's work.

Decibelle has also presented workshops in healthcare, finance, entertainment business, do-it-yourself car maintenance, independent publishing and donates proceeds to beneficiaries that promote social change, human rights, non-violence and cultural arts.  Past beneficiaries have included Burma's Shan Women's Action Network, National Organization for Women and Girls Rock Chicago. In 2006, a rock band of 12-year-old girls from the Chicago Girls Rock Camp opened for 1970s punk artist Nina Hagen. In 2005, The Shan Women's Action Network and the US Campaign for Burma spoke on stage about their efforts to end brutality against women in Burma.

Past Estrojam/Decibelle Artists

Peaches
Cat Power
Margaret Cho
Concrete Blonde
Wanda Jackson
Nina Hagen
Amy Ray of the Indigo Girls
The Gossip
ESG's last show
Thurston Moore
Anne Waldman
MEN (JD and Jo of Le Tigre)
Team Dresch
Miss Kittin
Leslie and the Ly's
The Brazilian Girls
Bahamadia
Ice Cream Socialites
Michelle Tea
Lady Tigra
Pretty Girls Make Graves
Sharon Jones & The Dap-Kings
All Girl Summer Fun Band
Capsula
Northern State
Kaki King
The Reputation
Kinnie Starr
Theo from the Lunachicks
Cynthia Plaster Caster
Staceyann Chin
Princess Superstar
Laura Love
Bitch and Animal
Ubaka Hill
Three Dollar Bill
National B-Girl Break Dancing Battle

References

External links
 DeciBelle

Music festivals in Chicago